The Defence Procurement Agency (DPA), was an Executive Agency of the United Kingdom Ministry of Defence responsible for the acquisition of materiel, equipment and services, for the British armed forces.

Led by the Chief of Defence Procurement, the Agency sourced equipment and services from its headquarters in Bristol.

History
The Defence Procurement Agency was established on 1 April 1999, after the announcement in the Strategic Defence Review of a specialised agency to succeed the MoD Procurement Executive.  From 1 April 2007 the agency was merged with the Defence Logistics Organisation to form a new organisation called Defence Equipment and Support.

References

1999 establishments in the United Kingdom
2007 disestablishments in the United Kingdom
United Kingdom defence procurement
Defunct executive agencies of the United Kingdom government
Government agencies established in 1999
Government agencies disestablished in 2007
Defence agencies of the United Kingdom